Nikolaus may refer to the following:

Places
 Church of St. Nikolaus, Lockenhaus, Austrian church
 St. Nikolaus parish church (Pfronten), German church
 Nikolaus Lenau High School, German high school

People
 Nikolaus (given name)

See also

 Niklaus (disambiguation)
 Nicolaus, a given name
 Nikolaos, a given name